Muppalaneni Shiva is an Indian film director and writer who works in Telugu cinema. He has directed movies for production houses like Suresh Productions, Super Good Films, Sravanthi Movies, Ramakrishna Cine Studios & Etharam films etc. His successful movies include Taj Mahal, Gilli Kajjalu, Priya O Priya, Ammayi Kosam, Raja, Sandade Sandadi & Sankrathi.

Childhood and early years
Muppalaneni Shiva was born at Bapatla, Guntur district, Andhra Pradesh on 25 November 1968. He studied in Pamidi Ankamma High School at his native place Narasaya Palem. He completed his graduation at Arts & Science College of Bapatla. During his college days, he was good at painting and achieved state level awards in modern art.

Career
At the start of his career he worked with A. Kodandarami Reddy, Muthyala Subbaiah and Paruchuri Brothers. He worked for more than 20 films under A. Kodanda Rami Reddy direction. At that time he worked with top stars Akkineni Nageswara Rao, Krishna, Sobhan Babu, Krishnam Raju, Srikanth, Chiranjeevi, Kamal Haasan and Sridevi. In 1994 he got a chance to direct a film with Superstar Krishna and the film name is Gharana Alludu. Finally he got a major break with Srikanth under Suresh Productions' Taj Mahal film in 1995.

Filmography

Awards
Nandi Award for Best Screenplay Writer – Nee Premakai

References

External links
 

Telugu film directors
Living people
People from Guntur district
1968 births
Nandi Award winners
Film directors from Andhra Pradesh
20th-century Indian film directors
21st-century Indian film directors